This article lists the main modern pentathlon events and their results for 2016.

2016 Summer Olympics (UIPM)
 August 18 – 20: 2016 Summer Olympics in  Rio de Janeiro at the Deodoro Modern Pentathlon Park
 Men:   Aleksander Lesun;   Pavlo Tymoshchenko;   Ismael Marcelo Hernandez Uscanga
 Women:   Chloe Esposito;   Élodie Clouvel;   Oktawia Nowacka

World modern pentathlon events
 May 22 – 29: 2016 World Modern Pentathlon Championships in  Moscow
 Individual winners:  Valentin Belaud (m) /  Sarolta Kovács (f)
 Team Relay winners:  (Hwang Woo-jin & Jun Woong-tae) (m) /  (Lena Schöneborn & Annika Schleu) (f)
 Mixed Team Relay winners:  (Aleksander Lesun & Donata Rimšaitė)
 Men's Team winners:  (Yasser Hefny, Amro El Geziry, & Omar El Geziry)
 Women's Team winners:  (Tamara Alekszejev, Zsofia Foldhazi, & Sarolta Kovács)
 July 12 – 19: 2016 World Youth "A" Modern Pentathlon Championships in  Limerick
 Youth Individual winners:  JEONG Young-jin (m) /  Aurora Tognetti (f)
 Youth Team Relay winners:  (JEONG Young-jin & KIM Woo-cheol) (m) /  (Aurora Tognetti & Elena Micheli) (f)
 Youth Mixed Team Relay winners:  (Xeina Fralcova & Andrei Zuev)
 Youth Men's Team winners:  (KIM Se-dong, KIM Dae-won, & JEONG Young-jin)
 Youth Women's Team winners:  (Mariia Khamppu, Xeina Fralcova, & Adelina Ibatullina)
 September 11 – 18: 2016 World Junior Modern Pentathlon Championships in  Cairo
 Junior Individual winners:  Charles Fernandez (m) /  KIM Sun-woo (f)
 Junior Team Relay winners:  (Alexander Lifanov & Serge Baranov) (m) /  (Sofia Serkina & Alena Popova) (f)
 Junior Mixed Team Relay winners:  (Matteo Cicinelli & Francesca Tognetti)
 Junior Men's Team winners:  (Danila Glavatskikh, Viacheslav Bardyshev, & Alexander Lifanov)
 Junior Women's Team winners:  (Aurora Tognetti, Irene Prampolini, & Francesca Tognetti)
 September 17 – 26: 2016 World CISM Military Modern Pentathlon Championships in  Warendorf
 Individual winners:  Yasser Hefny (m) /  Ekaterina Khuraskina (f)
 Mixed Team Relay winners:  (Oktawia Nowacka & Jaroslaw Swiderski)
 Men's Team winners:  (Sherif Rashad, Eslam Hamad, & Yasser Hefny)
 Women's Team winners:  (Anna Savchenko, Ekaterina Khuraskina, & Svetlana Lebedeva)

Continental modern pentathlon events
 March 15 – 20: 2016 Pan American & South American Modern Pentathlon Championships in  Buenos Aires
 Individual winners:  Nathan Schrimsher (m) /  Leidis Laura Moya (f)
 Men's Team winners:  (Nathan Schrimsher, Dennis Bowsher, & Lucas Schrimsher)
 Women's Team winners:  (Samantha Achterberg, Margaux Isaksen, & Isabella Isaksen)
 June 6 – 12: 2016 European Junior Modern Pentathlon Championships in  Drzonków
 Junior Individual winners:  Alessandro Colasanti (m) /  Francesca Tognetti (f)
 Junior Team Relay winners:  (Brice Loubet & Gregory Flayols) (m) /  (Sarolta Simon & Alexandra Boros) (f)
 Junior Mixed Team Relay winners:  (Ilya Palazkov & Iryna Prasiantsova)
 Junior Men's Team winners:  (Viacheslav Bardyshev, Danila Glavatskikh, & Alexander Lifanov)
 Junior Women's Team winners:  (Sofia Serkina, Alena Shornikova, & Xeina Fralcova) (f)
 July 4 – 11: 2016 European Modern Pentathlon Championships in  Sofia
 Individual winners:  Jan Kuf (m) /  Laura Asadauskaitė (f)
 Team Relay winners:  (Alexander Savkin & Aleksander Lesun) (m) /  (Iryna Prasiantsova & Katsiaryna Arol) (f)
 Mixed Team Relay winners:  (Natalie Dianová & Jan Kuf)
 Men's Team winners:  (Pierpaolo Petroni, Fabio Poddighe, & Riccardo De Luca)
 Women's Team winners:  (Gintarė Venčkauskaitė, Laura Asadauskaitė, & Karolina Guzauskaitė) (f)
 July 27 – 31: 2016 European Youth "A" Modern Pentathlon Championships (Tetrathlon) in  Barcelona
 Youth Individual winners:  Ivan Khamtsou (m) /  Xeina Fralcova (f)
 Youth Team Relay winners:  (Josh Miller & Harry Sykes) (m) /  (Aurora Tognetti & Elena Micheli) (f)
 Youth Mixed Team Relay winners:  (Xeina Fralcova & Andrei Zuev)
 August 25 – 28: 2016 European Youth "B" Modern Pentathlon Championships in  Solihull
 Youth Individual winners:  Giorgio Malan (m) /  Laura Heredia (f)
 Youth Team Relay winners:  (David Soponyai & Csaba Bohm) (m) /  (Katerina Tomanova & Veronika Novotna) (f)
 Youth Mixed Team Relay winners:  (Yaren Nur Polat & Alp Tas Mehmet)

2016 Modern Pentathlon World Cup
 February 21 – 28: MP World Cup #1 in  Cairo
 Individual winners:  Amro El Geziry (m) /  Lena Schöneborn (f)
 Mixed Team Relay winners:  (Auro Franceschini & Lavinia Bonessio)
 March 8 – 15: MP World Cup #2 in  Rio de Janeiro (Olympic Test Event)
 Individual winners:  JUN Woong-tae (m) /  Claudia Cesarini (f)
 Mixed Team Relay winners:  (Lena Schöneborn & Patrick Douge)
 March 30 – April 3: MP World Cup #3 in  Rome
 Individual winners:  Valentin Prades (m) /  Laura Asadauskaitė (f)
 Mixed Team Relay winners:  (Lorenzo Michele & Lavinia Bonessio)
 April 13 – 18: MP World Cup #4 in  Kecskemét
 Individual winners:  James Cooke (m) /  Anastasiya Prokopenko (f)
 Mixed Team Relay winners:  (Charles Fernandez & Isabel Brand)
 May 3 – 9: MP World Cup #5 (final) in  Sarasota, Florida
 Individual winners:  James Cooke (m) /  Lena Schöneborn (f)
 Mixed Team Relay winners:  (Arthur Lanigan-O'Keeffe & Natalya Coyle)

References

External links
 Union Internationale de Pentathlon Moderne Website (UIPM)

 
Modern pentathlon
2016 in sports